Mycoses: Diagnosis, Therapy and Prophylaxis of Fungal Diseases is a monthly peer-reviewed medical journal covering mycology. It is published by Wiley-Blackwell. The editor-in-chief are Oliver Cornely, Jacques Meis and Martin Schaller. It is the official publication of the Deutschsprachige Mykologische Gesellschaft. The journal covers the pathogenesis, diagnosis, therapy, prophylaxis, and epidemiology of fungal infectious diseases in humans and animals as well as on the biology of pathogenic fungi.

History 
The journal was established in 1957 by Heinz Grimmer (Wiesbaden) and published by Medizinische Verlags Anstalt (Berlin) under the title Mykosen (German for "mycoses"). It was originally published in German, but switched 1988 to English. At that time the title was changed to Mycoses.

Abstracting and indexing 
According to the Journal Citation Reports, the journal has a 2018 impact factor of 3.065.

References

External links
 

Mycology journals
Wiley-Blackwell academic journals
Monthly journals
English-language journals
Publications established in 1957